Romănești is one of Moldova's largest Moldovan wine producers from the north of Strășeni, part of the Codru Wine Region of Moldova. This winery is the former wine-making Imperial colony of Romanov dynasty.

The winery was once the leading wine producer of the former USSR. One of Romanesti's more famous products is a Bordeaux-type red wine, which was popular with the old Russian tsars.

See also
Moldovan wine producers

External links
 www.romanesti.moldagro.md - the official site

Wineries of Moldova
Moldovan brands
Wineries of the Soviet Union